Daniel Joseph Ryan (January 1, 1855 – June 15, 1923) was a Republican politician in the Ohio House of Representatives and Ohio Secretary of State from 1889 to 1892. He was later an author.

Daniel J. Ryan was born January, 1855 in Cincinnati, Ohio, where he lived till age seven when his family moved to Portsmouth, Ohio. His parents were John and Honora Ryan, natives of Ireland. He attended public schools and graduated from high school in 1875. In 1877 he was admitted to the bar. In April 1877, he was elected City Solicitor of Portsmouth, and re-elected in 1879. In 1883 Ryan was elected to the Ohio House of Representatives for the 66th General Assembly, and re-elected in 1885 for the 67th, where he was chosen Speaker pro tem. Ryan was elected Secretary of State in 1888, and re-elected in 1890. He resigned as Secretary of State April, 1891, to accept the office of Commissioner of the World's Fair for the State of Ohio.

Ryan was married to Myra L. Kerr of Portsmouth on January 10, 1884, had three children who died young, and two daughters who survived him. Secretary of State was his last elected office, and he devoted his later years to private practice and literary pursuits. Ryan served on the board of trustees of the Ohio Historical Society for thirty-four years.

Ryan died June 15, 1923. He was buried at Green Lawn Cemetery.

Publications

History of Ohio volumes 1-5 : 1912, volume 6 : 1915 :

Volume 2, Volume 3, Volume 4, Volume 5, Volume 6

Notes

References

Secretaries of State of Ohio
Politicians from Cincinnati
People from Portsmouth, Ohio
Ohio lawyers
1855 births
1923 deaths
Republican Party members of the Ohio House of Representatives
Burials at Green Lawn Cemetery (Columbus, Ohio)
American people of Irish descent
19th-century American lawyers
Historians from Ohio